The Gulf of Taranto is a gulf of the Ionian Sea, in Southern Italy.

The most important rivers are the Basento, the Sinni, and the Agri.

The main cities on the gulf are Taranto and Gallipoli. Also the Greek colonies (Magna Graecia) of Kroton, Heraclea, Thurii, and Sybaris were founded on the Gulf of Taranto.

Italy claims the whole gulf as national waters, thus closed to international traffic. This position, which is similar to that of Libya on the Gulf of Sidra, is not recognized by some other countries, such as the United States and the United Kingdom.

References

Gulfs of Italy
Gulfs of the Ionian Sea